S4 Entertainment Inc. is a North American artist development and management company.  Their current roster includes Promise, and R&B singer Roshana.

S4 Entertainment is also the home of the "Drumoff" Skills Competition sponsored by Yamaha Drums.

Current acts

Promise
Roshana

External links
 https://web.archive.org/web/20070429164133/http://www.s4entertainment.com/
 http://www.myspace.com/s4entertainment
 https://www.thestar.com/artsentertainment/article/164830

Music companies of Canada